The 2013 MLS Cup Playoffs was the eighteenth post-season tournament culminating the Major League Soccer regular season. The tournament began in late October and culminated on December 7, 2013, with MLS Cup 2013, the eighteenth league championship for MLS. This was the third year that the playoffs included ten teams, and the second playoff series since 2006 in which teams could not cross conference brackets. The top five teams in both the Eastern and Western conferences of the league earned berths, with the top three clubs in each conference earning direct byes to the conference semifinals. The fourth and fifth-place finishers of both conferences competed in a single-elimination play-in match.

The play-in winner played their respective conference regular season champion in the conference semifinals, which was a two-leg aggregate series, without the away goals rule enforced. For the second year in a row, each Conference Championship will also be a two-leg aggregate series, as opposed to the traditional single elimination match. The Conference winners meet in the MLS Cup, a single match hosted by the finalist with the better regular season record.

Los Angeles Galaxy were the defending champions, having defeated Houston Dynamo 3–1 in the 2012 MLS Cup.

In a break from previous years, only Sporting Kansas City, the MLS Cup winner, directly entered the 2014–15 CONCACAF Champions League, earning a Pot A seed. They were joined by the New York Red Bulls, the Supporters' Shield winner; the Portland Timbers, the conference winner from the conference opposite the Supporters' Shield winner; and D.C. United, the 2013 U.S. Open Cup champion. However, none of these berths were available to the league's three Canadian teams, which instead participated in the Canadian Championship for that country's single berth in the CONCACAF Champions League. The change from the MLS Cup runner-up gaining entry to the CONCACAF Champions League to the opposite conference winner gaining entry was new for 2013. The change was announced after the MLS Cup had been played, with the announcement stating that the teams knew in advance.

Format 

For 2013, the league kept the format the same as the 2012 edition. In 2012, the league's previous system of "wild card" qualification—which had the potential for "crossover" series in which one team could play in the other conference's bracket—was scrapped. Instead, the current system has the top five teams in each conference qualify for the playoffs and the two conference brackets are entirely separate. The First Round of each conference is a one-off match between the 4th and 5th place teams, similar to the previous wild card system, with the 4th-place team hosting. The First Round winner advances to play the conference's top seed in the Conference Semifinals.

Conference Semifinals and Conference Championship series are conducted in a home-and-away aggregate-goal format. The lower-seeded team in the Conference Semifinal hosts the first game, and the higher seed hosts the second. If the teams are tied after two games, a 30-minute extra time period (divided into two 15-minute periods) will be played followed by penalty kicks, if necessary. The away goals rule or golden goal is not used.

In the case of ties in the First Round and MLS Cup, extra time and penalty kicks are used in the same manner as above.

Qualification 

Eastern Conference

Western Conference

Tiebreak rules
When two or more teams are tied in standings on points the following tiebreak rules apply:

 Most wins
 Goals for
 Goal differential 
 Fewest disciplinary points in the official points table (foul: 1 pt, first yellow: 3 pts, second yellow: 5 pts, straight red: 6 pts, disciplinary commission suspension: 6 pts, etc.)
 Road goals
 Road goal differential
 Home goals
 Home goal differential
 Coin toss (two teams) or drawing of lots (three or more teams)

Bracket

Schedule

Knockout round

Eastern Conference

Western Conference

Conference Semifinals

Eastern Conference

Sporting Kansas City won 4–3 on aggregate

Houston Dynamo won 4–3 on aggregate

Western Conference

Portland Timbers won 5–3 on aggregate

Real Salt Lake won 2–1 on aggregate

Conference Finals

Sporting Kansas City won 2–1 on aggregate

Real Salt Lake won 5–2 on aggregate

MLS Cup

Result

See also 
 2013 in American soccer
 2013 Major League Soccer season
 2013 U.S. Open Cup

References 

2013